2 Camelopardalis is a triple star system in the northern circumpolar constellation of Camelopardalis, next to the southern constellation border with Perseus. It is dimly visible to the naked eye with a combined apparent visual magnitude of 5.36. It is drifting further away with a radial velocity of +20 km/s.

The primary member of 2 Camelopardalis, designated component A, is an A-type main-sequence star with a spectral type of A8V. It has an apparent magnitude of 5.86, and has a secondary with an apparent magnitude of 7.35, designated component B. The two orbit each other on a very eccentric orbit with a period of 26.34 years. Further out, there is an eight-magnitude companion (designated component C), orbiting once every few hundred years. As the third star was previously thought to be relatively massive for its luminosity, it was suspected of being a binary star itself, but the current estimate of component C's magnitude as a single star matches its absolute magnitude.

References 

A-type main-sequence stars
Triple star systems
Camelopardalis (constellation)
Durchmusterung objects
Camelopardalis, 02
029316
021730
1466